The Beijing–Hangzhou high-speed train are high-speed train services between Beijing and Hangzhou, the capital of Zhejiang Province. The trains are operated by CR Beijing and CR Shanghai.

History
The high-speed train services between Beijing and Hangzhou was started on 1 July 2011, when the Beijing–Shanghai HSR was opened. The trains were operated on Beijing–Shanghai HSR and Shanghai–Hangzhou HSR.

With the opening of Nanjing–Hangzhou HSR on 1 July 2013, some of the trains were diverted to Nanjing–Hangzhou HSR instead of Shanghai–Hangzhou HSR.

From 10 April 2018, the G19/20, G31/32 and G39/40 trains have been operating CR400AF and CR400BF trainsets.

Operations
The G19/20, G31/32, G34, G35/36, G37 and G39/40 trains were operated on Beijing–Shanghai HSR and Nanjing–Hangzhou HSR. The G41-44 trains were operated on Beijing–Shanghai HSR and Shanghai–Hangzhou HSR, via .

Rolling stocks
The services are operated by CRH380B, CRH380BL, CR400AF and CR400BF trainsets.

CRH380B
The CRH380B trainsets on this service have the formation shown below.

CRH380BL
The 16-car CRH380BL trainsets are the most common on this service.

CR400AF and CR400BF 
The G19/20, G31/32 and G39/40 trains were operated by CR400AF and CR400BF trainsets.

CR400BF-A
The G41/44 train were operated by CR400BF-A trainsets.

Previously used rolling stocks 
 CRH380AL: From April 2017, due to the maintenance of some of the CRH380BL and CRH380CL EMUs, the G41/44 trains temporarily used CRH380AL EMUs for operation. 
 CRH380D: The G42/39 train used CRH380D trainsets in 2015, but was changed to CRH380BL in 2016.

References

China Railway passenger services
Passenger rail transport in China
Railway services introduced in 2011